Lesley Harris (born 1954) is a former badminton player.

Harris took part in 1977 IBF World Championships.

References

Canadian female badminton players
1954 births
Living people